Franjo Vuleta (born 31 January 1968) is a Bosnian former footballer who for the most of his career played in Switzerland where he arrived from Bosnia before the war. He played as a striker.

His son Stjepan Vuleta is also a professional football player.

Career

Vuleta started playing in lower league side NK Vitez, the club from his hometown. Good display drew attraction of Sarajevo so he and his teammate Vejsil Varupa signed for this first league team in the summer of 1989. After just one season, he moved to Switzerland where he continued to play in amateur level until the age of 42.

References

External links
  stats

1968 births
Living people
FK Sarajevo players
Swiss people of Bosnia and Herzegovina descent
Association football forwards
Yugoslav footballers
People from Vitez
Yugoslav emigrants to Switzerland
Bosnia and Herzegovina footballers